Al-Mawasi is a Palestinian Bedouin town on the southern coast of the Gaza Strip, approximately one kilometer wide and fourteen kilometers long, that prior to Israel's unilateral disengagement plan in 2005 existed as a Palestinian enclave within the Katif bloc of Israeli settlements. According to the Palestinian Central Bureau of Statistics, al-Mawasi had a population of 1,409 in mid-year 2006.

External links 
UNICEF Brings Critical Supplies to the Isolated Children of Al-Mawasi
 Al-Mawasi, Gaza Strip: Impossible Life in an Isolated Enclave  B'Tselem publication

Villages in the Gaza Strip
Rafah Governorate
Bedouins in the State of Palestine
Populated coastal places in Palestinian territories
Municipalities of the State of Palestine